Peadar Byrne is an Irish Gaelic footballer who plays for the Meath county team since making his senior debut in 2005.

Byrne received a suspension of four weeks in 2008 after being involved in a clash during the final round of the League against old rivals Dublin.
In 2010 he was suspended for a length of time after an incident during a club match.

References

External links

Year of birth missing (living people)
Living people
Meath inter-county Gaelic footballers